Anthony Moran (born August 14, 1957) is an American actor and producer. He is known for briefly playing the unmasked Michael Myers in the 1978 horror classic Halloween. Since then he has gone on to make guest appearances in television series The Waltons and CHiPs. He is the elder brother of fellow actors Erin Moran (of Happy Days fame) and John Moran.

Career

Halloween
Tony Moran was a struggling actor before he got the role of Michael Myers in Halloween. At the time he had a job on Hollywood and Vine dressed up as Frankenstein. Moran had the same agent as his sister, Erin, who played Joanie Cunningham on Happy Days.    When Moran went to audition for the role of Michael Myers in 1978, he met for an interview with director John Carpenter and producer Irwin Yablans. He has since stated that he originally did not want to do the movie, only changing his mind when he got confirmation that Donald Pleasence would be in it. He later got a call back and was told he had got the part.

Moran was paid $250 for his appearance in Halloween and did not return for any of the sequels, although he was paid for his appearance at the beginning of Halloween II, which was a recap of the first film.

Halloween conventions
Moran quit acting at age thirty and then worked as a mortgage broker.

Moran appeared at two Halloween conventions in Salem at Count Orlok's Night.

Other work
Halloween was Moran's only film for 30 years. Through the late seventies and early eighties, he has made guest appearances in several television series including CHiPs, The Waltons, James at 15, and California Fever.

In 2008, Moran returned to acting with the short film The Lucky Break. In 2010, he produced and starred in the horror film Beg, which also stars his Halloween co-star P.J. Soles. In 2014 he starred in Dead Bounty. In 2014 he appeared in the documentary film Horror Icon: Inside Michael’s Mask with Tony Moran, which premiered in October 2015.

In 2017, Moran reprised the role of Michael Myers in a Halloween fan film, Halloween: The Night Evil Died, becoming only the fourth actor to play Michael Myers more than once.

Controversy 
In April 2021, Moran became the subject of controversy after numerous comments he made regarding various Halloween cast members resurfaced online. Moran made unsubstantiated allegations about director John Carpenter's relationship with producer Debra Hill; alongside insinuating Jamie Lee Curtis was sexually active with the crew of the film. He was also shown using homophobic slurs towards later Michael Myers actors Tyler Mane and James Jude Courtney during podcast appearences. 

Prior to the release of Halloween Kills, Moran made comments at various appearances suggesting he would be appearing in the film in a cameo role. However, Moran does not appear in the final film, leading to speculation that his appearance was cut due to backlash from his then-recent controversy.

Filmography

Film

Television

References

External links

1957 births
American male film actors
American male television actors
Living people